The 1956 Soviet Chess Championship was the 23rd edition of USSR Chess Championship. Held from 10 January to 15 February 1956 in Leningrad. The tournament was won by Mark Taimanov who defeats Boris Spassky and Yuri Averbakh in a play-off. The final were preceded by semifinals events at Leningrad, Moscow and Riga.This edition marked the debut of the future world champion Mikhail Tal, often described as the magician from Riga, who demonstrated his over-adventurous tactical style, notably in the third round against Simagin, who had the honor to be one of the first to wonder about the soundness of the piece sacrifice that had defeated him.

Table and results

Play-off 

Averbakh won the second game against Spassky by walkover since Spassky couldn't play due to illness.

References 

USSR Chess Championships
Championship
Chess
1956 in chess
Chess